Arahuetes is a municipality located in the province of Segovia, in Castile and León, Spain. According to the 2017 census (INE), the municipality has a population of 41 inhabitants.

References

Municipalities in the Province of Segovia